Thomas De Bock (born 20 August 1991) is a Belgian long-distance runner. In 2019, he competed in the men's marathon at the 2019 World Athletics Championships held in Doha, Qatar. He finished in 42nd place.

Career 

In 2017, he represented Belgium at the 2017 Summer Universiade, held in Taipei, Taiwan, in the men's half marathon event. He did not finish his race.

He won the silver medal in the men's 5000 metres event at the 2018 Belgian Athletics Championships held in Brussels, Belgium. In the same year, he also finished in 15th place in the 2018 Berlin Marathon held in Berlin, Germany.

In 2019, he finished in 22nd place in the 2019 London Marathon held in London, United Kingdom.

Competition record

References

External links 
 

Living people
1991 births
Place of birth missing (living people)
Belgian male long-distance runners
Belgian male marathon runners
World Athletics Championships athletes for Belgium
Competitors at the 2017 Summer Universiade
20th-century Belgian people
21st-century Belgian people